The Baltimore Canaries were a professional baseball club in the National Association from 1872 to 1874.

History
The team was usually listed as Lord Baltimore in the box scores of the day, and were also referred to as the Yellow Stockings. The canary and yellow stockings labels were in reference to their uniform colors.

Though visually striking, the club's uniforms were not necessarily universally acclaimed. The Chicago Inter-Ocean reporter, covering a game staged in Chicago on May 29, 1872, described "the Baltimore nine, clad in yellow pants, white shirts, white hats, and ugly looking black and yellow stockings."

The Canaries played their home games at Newington Park in Baltimore, Maryland. Newington Park was located on Pennsylvania Avenue in Baltimore city. They played under five different managers in their three seasons, winning 78 games and losing 79.

Notable alumni
Candy Cummings, Baseball Hall of Famer
Bobby Mathews, won 297 games in his career
Lip Pike, major league baseball 4x home run champion

See also
Baltimore Canaries all-time roster
1872 Baltimore Canaries season
1873 Baltimore Canaries season
1874 Baltimore Canaries season

References

 
Defunct National Association baseball teams
Defunct baseball teams in Maryland
Baseball teams disestablished in 1874
Baseball teams established in 1872